Paula Margaret Duncan  (born 15 September 1952) is an Australian actress.

Her numerous television roles include playing in Number 96 as Carol Finlayson (1974-1975), The Young Doctors (1976–77), as Nurse Lisa Brooks,  Cop Shop as Detective Danni Francis (1977–83), for which she twice won the Logie Award for Most Popular Actress, Prisoner as Lorelei Wilkinson (1986),  Richmond Hill as Janet Bryant (1988), Home and Away as Bridget Jackson (1990) and Neighbours (2011). Other notable roles include Paradise Beach and Breakers.

Duncan's older sister was stage and screen actress Carmen Duncan.

Career

Duncan was born in Cooma, New South Wales, Duncan has played several leading roles in various TV series. Early roles were Carol Finlayson in Number 96 (her sister Carmen Duncan had previously acted in this serial), followed by Lisa Brooks in The Young Doctors. She left The Young Doctors to take the role of Danni Francis in Cop Shop, and stayed in the role for the series' entire 1977–1984 run. After Cop Shop ended she played Lorelei Wilkinson in Prisoner in 1986, then was Janet Bryant in Richmond Hill (1988) for its entire run, Bridget Jackson in Home and Away, and Joan Hayden in Paradise Beach.

In 2011 Duncan joined the cast of Neighbours as Carolyn Johnstone, a love interest for Harold Bishop (Ian Smith). Duncan previously appeared in the show as Amy Medway in 1985.

Advertising

Duncan is well known to Australian audiences through her work on television commercials, especially humorous commercials for the Ajax household cleaner Spray N' Wipe, from 1988 to 2010.

She has also made guest appearances on the NRL Footy Show on Network Nine.

Personal life

Duncan married actor John Orcsik in June 1982 after they met acting together in Cop Shop. They opened acting school, The Australian Film & Television Academy (TAFTA) together on the Gold Coast in 1994. They divorced in 1998. They have since worked together in the show Paradise Beach and elsewhere.

Filmography

Film

Television

STAGE/THEATRE

 Dick Whittington And His Cat (1972)
 Salad Days (1983)
 Half In Earnest (1985)
 Hansel And Gretel's Aussie Adventure (1987)
 Blithe Spirit (1987)
 Bedroom Farce (1989)
 The Lady's Not For Burning (1990)
 Brazilian Blue (1995)
 Social Climbers (1998)
 The Vagina Monologues (2002)
 Flying Solo (2007)
 Theatresports (2008)

References

External links 

1952 births
Living people
20th-century Australian actresses
21st-century Australian actresses
Actresses from New South Wales
Australian film actresses
Australian soap opera actresses
Members of the Order of Australia
Logie Award winners
People from Cooma